Stringtown is an unincorporated community in Greene County, in the U.S. state of Ohio.

History
The community was named for the manner in which the houses were strung along the road.

References

Unincorporated communities in Greene County, Ohio
Unincorporated communities in Ohio